The Lake Télé Community Reserve is found in the Republic of the Congo. It was established on the 10 May 2001. This site covers  around Lake Télé.
In August 2010, the Cooperation Agreement between the governments of the Republic of the Congo and the Democratic Republic of the Congo (DRC) on the Lake Tele - Lake Tumba landscape provided for creation of a trans-national protected area including the Lake Télé Community Reserve and the Ngiri-Tumba-Maindombe area in the DRC.

The reserve is a huge area of inaccessible swamp forest, with no roads. In 2006 and 2007 researchers from the US-based Wildlife Conservation Society investigated the region, finding evidence of an estimated population of 125,000 Western lowland gorillas.
This was more than the current estimated total population of the species.

The soil under this reserve contains major stores of peat which is rich in carbon. This discovery makes conservation of the area even more crucial, as if disturbed the carbon could  escape into the atmosphere exacerbating global warming. In light of this discovery, the Wildlife Conservation Society advocated expansion of the reserve.

References

Protected areas of the Republic of the Congo
Protected areas established in 2001
Ramsar sites in the Republic of the Congo